Abul Hossain ( – 16 December 2016) was a Bangladeshi freedom fighter politician from Lalmonirhat belonging to Bangladesh Awami League. He was a member of the Jatiya Sangsad.

Biography
Hossain was elected as a member of the Pakistan National Assembly in 1970. He took part in the Liberation War of Bangladesh in 1971. After the liberation he was elected as a member of the Jatiya Sangsad from Rangpur-14 in 1973. Later, he was elected as a member of the Jatiya Sangsad from Lalmonirhat-3 in 1986.

Hossain died on 16 December 2016 at the age of 81.

References

1930s births
2016 deaths
People from Lalmonirhat District
1st Jatiya Sangsad members
3rd Jatiya Sangsad members
Awami League politicians
People of the Bangladesh Liberation War